Karl F. Schöchlin (13 June 1894 – 7 November 1974) was a Swiss rower. Together with his elder brother Hans he won nine medals in various events at the European championships of 1920 to 1931. The brothers also won the gold medal in the coxed pair at the 1928 Summer Olympics.

References

1894 births
1974 deaths
Olympic rowers of Switzerland
Rowers at the 1928 Summer Olympics
Olympic gold medalists for Switzerland
Olympic medalists in rowing
Swiss male rowers
Medalists at the 1928 Summer Olympics
European Rowing Championships medalists